Beautiful Game Studios is a British video game developer based in London, England. The studio was set up in 2003 to take over the development of the Championship Manager after its former developer Sports Interactive ceased its involvement. Beautiful Game Studios was majorly restructured in November 2009, losing 80% of its staff.

History 
Beautiful Game Studios was founded in 2003, and announced in January 2004 as an internal development team of Eidos Interactive (later renamed Square Enix Europe) that would focus on the development of Championship Manager, after the original developer of the series, Sports Interactive, departed from Eidos Interactive in 2003.

In November 2009, after Eidos Interactive had been acquired by Square Enix and renamed Square Enix Europe, Square Enix announced that Beautiful Game Studios would undergo restructuring to "build a successful commercial future" for the Championship Manager brand. Around 80% of jobs, including the majority of the studio's programming department, were either cut or relocated to Eidos Shanghai, while incumbent general manager Roy Meredith retained his position. Despite the significant cuts, remained operational as a developer.

In September 2010, Beautiful Game Studios announced that they had entered into a strategic partnership with Chinese publisher Shanda Games, which granted Shanda Games the Chinese distribution rights of future Championship Manager games. The partnership grew largely from the then-enlarged Eidos Shanghai's previous work with Shanda Games, as well as long-term communications between Beautiful Game Studios, Eidos Shanghai, and Shanda Games. The games resulting from this partnership, Championship Manager: World of Football, was announced in July 2011.

References 

2003 establishments in England
Square Enix
Video game companies established in 2003
Video game companies of the United Kingdom
Video game development companies